Sachin Sen was an Indian politician. He was a member of the Legislative Assembly from Ballygunge constituency (1977–1992), where he was Chief Government Whip (1989-1991) of the Government of West Bengal.

Early life and education
Sachin Sen was born on 1 June 1917 in Galla, Sylhet District, Bangladesh. He attended school at Maulavi Bazar Govt.High School in Sylhet, which is now in Bangladesh. He graduated from the Murari Chand College under the University of Calcutta. He was a first division football player.

He joined the Communist Party of India before India's independence and sided with the CPI(M) after the split. He was also a member of All India Students' Federation.

Political career
He was a very promising member of CPIM. He worked tirelessly at the grassroots level in refugee settlements in Calutta. He was also elected to the Calcutta Municipal Corporation.

He unsuccessfully contested from the Rashbehari Avenue Assembly constituency in the 1971 West Bengal Legislative Assembly election and 1972 West Bengal Legislative Assembly election, but lost both times.

He was a member of the CPI(M) Kolkata District Committee and District Secretariat. He was elected to a member of CPI(M) West Bengal State Committee in 1980s.

He was elected from Ballygunge Assembly Constituency, part of South Kolkata Lok Sabha constituency. He was nominated to contest from Ballygunge in 1977 and won the support and confidence of the people. He was re-elected in 1982, 1987, 1991.

Sen also served as the Government Chief Whip in West Bengal Legislative Assembly between 1989 and 1991.

He was a senior leader of All India Chemical and Pharmaceutical Employees Federation, too. He was also a member of the general council of Centre of Indian Trade Unions.

He has also contributed a lot in pharma industry's field workers movement.

Sports Administration
Being a football player he was active in sports administration in the state. He was a member of the Cricket Association of Bengal since 1971.

Sen was also elected to the governing Body of Indian Football Association since 1989 and was also the General Secretary of East Bengal Club,Calcutta,1990.

Controversy
He was one of the accused in the Bijon Setu massacre, where 16 Hindu sadhus and a sadhvi belonging to Ananda Marga, were burned to death at Bijon Setu, near Ballygunge, Kolkata, in West Bengal, India, on 30 April 1982.

Although the attacks were carried out in broad daylight, no arrests were ever made. After repeated calls for a formal judicial investigation, a single-member judicial commission was set up to investigate the killings in 2012.

Personal life
He was married to Sadhana Sen. The couple had two sons. He passed away in 1992, while serving as a member of the assembly.

References

1917 births
1992 deaths
Communist Party of India (Marxist) politicians from West Bengal
West Bengal MLAs 1977–1982
West Bengal MLAs 1982–1987
West Bengal MLAs 1987–1991
West Bengal MLAs 1991–1996